The men's light flyweight (49 kilograms) event at the 2010 Asian Games took place from 18 to 26 November 2010 at Lingnan Mingzhu Gymnasium, Foshan, China.

Schedule
All times are China Standard Time (UTC+08:00)

Results 
Legend
RSC — Won by referee stop contest

Final

Top half

Bottom half

 Masoud Rigi of Iran originally finished 17th, but was disqualified after he tested positive for Nandrolone.

References

External links
Official website

Men's 049